Dudleya palmeri is a species of succulent plant in the family Crassulaceae known by the common name Palmer's liveforever. This Dudleya is endemic to California where it grows along the coast. It is characterized by orange to red over yellow or pink flowers. It is a polyploid species that closely resembles Dudleya lanceolata but has a coastal habit, and hybridizes with Dudleya caespitosa and Dudleya cymosa.

Description

Vegetative morphology 

This species has a habit that may form solitary or caespitose plants of up to 8 rosettes, with each rosette 5 to 55 cm wide. The stem of older plants is typically shaded by desiccated leaves. The leaves are 5 to 20 cm long, and 1.5 to 5 cm wide, 3 to 8 mm thick, and shaped lance-oblong to lanceolate. The upper surface of the leaf is flat or transversely convex, and the leaves may or may not be covered in an epicuticular wax. When the leaves are removed from the plant, the remaining leaf bases will turn red with the wound. The tips are acute to acuminate, and the margins are often angled between the upper and lower leaf surfaces.

Reproductive morphology 
The inflorescence is borne on a peduncle 15 to 85 cm tall, and 4 to 11 mm wide. It branches around 3 times, and then consequently may rebranch up to 2 times. The terminal branches are 5 to 8 cm long, and have 5 to 14 flowers. The flowers are suspended on erect pedicels 2 to 10 mm long. The flowers have sepals 3 to 5 mm long, shaped deltate to ovate, with an acute tip. The petals are 11 to 16 mm long, 3 to 5 mm wide, shaped elliptic, and colored a red over yellow, bright yellow marked with red, and orange, with the tips of the petals erect and acute.

The chromosome number is varied, 2n = 136, 170, 238. Flowering is late spring, typically from May to July

Taxonomy

Taxonomic history 
The first collection of this plant was made in San Simeon Bay by a Dr. E Palmer in 1877, whom the specific epithet is named after, and described by Sereno Watson in 1879 as Cotyledon palmeri. The type specimen also regards the petal color as "pale lemon-yellow," rather than the currently accepted definition of D. palmeri encompassing red and orange petaled plants.

Classification 
This plant is only more or less distinct from Dudleya lanceolata and Dudleya caespitosa. Some botanists regard the Dudleya caespitosa plants in Monterey County with red-petaled flowers to be closer to this species. It is within a species complex that includes Dudleya farinosa, Dudleya caespitosa, Dudleya greenei, and Dudleya candelabrum.

Distribution and habitat 
This species occurs from the Santa Lucia Mountains in Monterey County along the coast south to the Santa Monica Mountains in Los Angeles County. It is found on the rocky slopes and cliffs near the coast, from a height of 0 to 100 meters.

References

External links
Jepson Manual Treatment- Dudleya palmeri
USDA Plants Profile; Dudleya palmeri
Dudleya palmeri - Photo gallery

palmeri
Endemic flora of California
Natural history of the California chaparral and woodlands
Natural history of Los Angeles County, California
Natural history of San Luis Obispo County, California
Natural history of Santa Barbara County, California
Natural history of Ventura County, California
Natural history of the Santa Monica Mountains
Taxa named by Sereno Watson
Taxa named by Joseph Nelson Rose